The Haiti national futsal team is controlled by the Fédération Haïtienne de Football, the governing body for futsal in Haiti, and represents the country in international futsal competitions, such as the CONCACAF Championships, but has yet to qualify for a World Cup.

Tournaments

FIFA Futsal World Cup
 1989 to 2008 - did not qualify
 2012 to 2016 - did not enter
 2020 - TBD

CONCACAF Futsal Championship
 1996 - did not qualify
 2000 - did not qualify
 2004 - did not qualify
 2008 - 8th
 2012 - did not enter
 2016 - did not enter
 2021 - 11th

References

External links
Haiti at FIFA.com

Haiti
National sports teams of Haiti
Futsal in Haiti